The Gospel Magazine is a Calvinist, evangelical Christian magazine from the United Kingdom, and is one of the longest running of such periodicals, having been founded in 1766. Most of the editors have been Anglicans. It is currently published bi-monthly.

A number of well-known hymns, including Augustus Montague Toplady's Rock of Ages, first appeared in the Gospel Magazine. Toplady, sponsored by Selina Hastings, Countess of Huntingdon, used the magazine to attack John Wesley. Other contributors included John Newton, the organist William Shrubsole (1760–1806), the hymn writer Daniel Turner (1710–98) and (at a later date) the particular Baptist minister John Andrew Jones (1779–1868).

The Gospel Magazine Trust is currently working to scan their extant copies—going back 240 years—and upload them onto the website.

List of editors
 1766–74: Joseph Gurney (died 1815)
 1774–75 & 1776: William Mason (1719–91)
 December 1775–June 1776: Augustus Montague Toplady
 1776–1805: Erasmus Middleton (1739–1805)

Some time between 1783 and 1796 the Gospel Magazine was suspended for a period, and a magazine called the New Spiritual Magazine was produced.

 1796–1838: Walter Row, a personal friend of Toplady
 1839–40: Bagnall Baker, a High Anglican (but not Anglo-Catholic)
 June 1840–93: David Alfred Doudney (1811–93)
 1893–94: George Cowell
 1895–1916: James Ormiston, rector of St Mary le Port Church, Bristol
 1916–51: Thomas Houghton
 1951–64: William Dodgson Sykes
 1964–75: Herbert M. Carson (died 2004)
 1976–81: John Tallach, then Free Presbyterian minister in Kinlochbervie, later Church of Scotland minister in Cromarty until 2011
 1981–2000: Maurice Handford
 2000–13 : Edward Malcolm
 2014– : Edward J. Malcolm

References

External links
 Gospel Magazine official website
 Gospel Magazine page on GraceNet
 . The Copper Coast. Page mentions several other editors.

Magazines established in 1766
Christian magazines
Calvinism
Religious magazines published in the United Kingdom
Anglicanism
Bi-monthly magazines published in the United Kingdom